Adrion Pajaziti (born 16 November 2002) is a professional footballer who plays as a midfielder for Haugesund, on loan from  Fulham. Born in England, he has represented Kosovo and Albania at youth levels.

Club career

Fulham
Pajaziti at the age of twelve started playing football in at the Fulham Academy. He made his debut for the U18 squad on 6 October 2018 aged only 15 as he came on as a substitute at 81st minute in place of Ben Davis during a 7–0 thrashing against Reading U18.

Pajaziti signed a scholarship deal with the club on 1 July 2019 and was appointed captain of the U18 squad at the start of the 2020–21 season. On 28 October 2020, he signed his first professional deal with Fulham, keeping him at the club until the summer of 2022. His first team debut came on 24 August 2021 away at Birmingham City in a 2–0 win in which he started and played in the entire match.

Haugesund
Pajaziti made a loan move away from his boyhood club in late February 2023, signing for Norwegian side Haugesund for the 2023 season. He was given the number 10 shirt and the loan included an option to buy.

International career

Albania
On 8 October 2019, Pajaziti received a call-up from Albania U19 for the friendly match against Poland U19, and made his debut after coming on as a substitute. He was planned to be called up from Albania U21 in March 2021 for a training camp held from 22–30 March 2021 and for unofficial friendly matches against Tirana and Bylis, but was unable to join the squad due to COVID-related travel restrictions.

Kosovo
On 15 March 2021, Pajaziti received a call-up from Kosovo U21 for the friendly matches against Qatar U23, but was unable to join the squad due to COVID-related travel restrictions. On 17 March 2021, he received again a call-up from Kosovo U21 for the 2023 UEFA European Under-21 Championship qualification match against Andorra U21, but he was an unused substitute in this match. His debut with Kosovo U21 came on 7 September 2021 in a 2023 UEFA European Under-21 Championship qualification match against England U21 after being named in the starting line-up.

Return to Albania
On 17 September 2022, Pajaziti received a call-up from Albania U20 for the friendly matches against North Macedonia U20 and Croatia U20. His debut with Albania U20 came six days later in a friendly match against North Macedonia U20 after being named in the starting line-up and scored his side's only goal during a 1–3 away defeat.

Career statistics

References

External links

2000 births
Living people
Footballers from Greater London
Albanian footballers
Albania youth international footballers

Kosovan footballers
Kosovo under-21 international footballers
English footballers
English people of Kosovan descent
English people of Albanian descent
Kosovo Albanians
Association football midfielders
Fulham F.C. players